Eutrypanus signaticornis is a species of longhorn beetles of the subfamily Lamiinae. It was described by Laporte in 1840, and is known from eastern Brazil.

References

Beetles described in 1840
Acanthocinini
Endemic fauna of Brazil
Insects of South America